Damsol is a district of Donggala Regency, Central Sulawesi, Indonesia. The district capital is Sabang.

References

Central Sulawesi